Pedro Gual Villalbí (20 November 1885 – 12 January 1968) was a Spanish politician who served as a minister without portfolio between 1957 and 1965, as well as briefly as acting Minister of Housing between March and April 1960, during the Francoist dictatorship.

References

1885 births
1968 deaths
Government ministers during the Francoist dictatorship